Spree TV was an Australian free-to-air datacasting television channel mainly carrying paid programming and home shopping, launched on 17 September 2013 by Ten Network Holdings and Brand Developers.

Though datacasting was intended by the Labor government of the time to broadcast telecourses and other non-commercial content, without any legislative restriction on its use, most Australian broadcasters have utilized the datacasting services for teleshopping instead. For the most part however, the general public has ignored these datacasting teleshopping channels, resulting in their swift discontinuation. Aspire TV, a similar channel by content, met this fate a year earlier on 31 July 2021.

Spree TV first aired on channel 15, before moving to channel 17 in 2020 after the launch of 10 Shake. It closed on 12 August 2022. A similarly formatted teleshopping network titled Gecko launched on its space on 18 September 2022.

See also

List of digital television channels in Australia

References

Network 10
Digital terrestrial television in Australia
Television channels and stations established in 2013
Television channels and stations disestablished in 2022
English-language television stations in Australia
2013 establishments in Australia
2022 disestablishments in Australia
Home shopping television stations in Australia
Defunct television channels in Australia